WIKB may refer to:

 WIKB-FM, a radio station (99.1 FM) licensed to Iron River, Michigan, United States
 WFER, a radio station (1230 AM) licensed to Iron River, Michigan, United States, which held the call sign WIKB until May 2010